Michael Tipping is an American writer, activist, and politician from Maine. A Democrat, Tipping serves in the Maine State Senate representing District 8. He grew up in Orono, Maine and attended Orono High School and Dalhousie University, working as a progressive activist on several statewide referendum questions and for an initiative to clean mercury pollution from the Penobscot River. Tipping announced his run for the Maine Senate in September 2021, and was elected in November of 2022 to his first term.

Early life and career
Tipping Grew up in Orono and attended Asa Adams Elementary School, Orono Middle School and Orono High School. He then attended Dalhousie University in Nova Scotia. Tipping worked as a progressive activist for various causes in Maine, including a successful 2016 referendum to increase Maine's minimuim wage, a 2018 referendum to provide universal home care for Maine citizens over the age of 65, as well as an environmental initiative to clean up mercury pollution in the Penobscot River.

In 2014, Tipping published As Maine Went: Governor Paul LePage and the Tea Party Takeover of Maine about Maine Governor Paul LePage.

Politics
Tipping announced in September 2021 that he would run for the Maine State Senate. He faced Democrat Abe Furth in the June 2022 primary, defeating him 62%-38%. In the November 2022 general election, Tipping defeated Republican Eric Rojo 53%-47%.

Personal life
Tipping lives in Orono with his wife, Maggie, and their twin children. He works as a senior strategist for the Maine People's Alliance.

Electoral history

References

External links
Mike Tipping on Twitter

1984 births
Living people
Dalhousie University alumni
Democratic Party Maine state senators
People from Orono, Maine
Activists from Maine